St Anne's Church is a Roman Catholic church on Highfield Road in Rock Ferry, Birkenhead, Merseyside, England. It is a Grade II listed building.

History
It was built for the Oblates of St Mary Immaculate by Peter Paul Pugin and Cuthbert Pugin to designs by their brother Edward Welby Pugin - Edward had planned a south-west tower but this was never built. Its foundation stone was laid on 9 May 1875 by James Brown, Bishop of Shrewsbury and the church was opened on 28 October 1877. A presbytery was added between 1884 and 1885 and side aisles in 1934. The parish was served by the Oblates until it transferred the church to the Diocese of Shrewsbury in September 2010. The parish is currently served by Fr. Bernard Forshaw and Rev. John Boggan.

References

External links
 

Roman Catholic churches in Merseyside
Grade II listed buildings in Liverpool
Grade II listed churches in Merseyside
Churches completed in 1877
19th-century Roman Catholic church buildings in the United Kingdom
Gothic Revival church buildings in England
Gothic Revival architecture in Merseyside
Roman Catholic Diocese of Shrewsbury
1877 establishments in England